Metasia eremialis is a moth in the family Crambidae. It was described by George Hampson in 1913. It is found in South Africa.

References

Endemic moths of South Africa
Moths described in 1913
Metasia